Frisia is a coastal region in northwest Europe.

Frisia may also refer to:
 Magna Frisia or Frisian Kingdom, a medieval kingdom between 600 and 734
 Lordship of Frisia, a feudal domain between 1524 and 1795
 Friesland, a province of the Netherlands
 Donato Frisia (1883–1953), an Italian painter
 Frisia Museum or Scheringa Museum of Realist Art, a former museum in the Netherlands
 Frisia Tree or Robinia pseudoacacia, a species of the tree genus Robinia

See also
 Freesia (disambiguation)
 Friesland (disambiguation)